Glob may refer to:

People
Lotte Glob (born 1944), Danish ceramic artist living in the north of Scotland
Niels Glob, Roman Catholic prelate who served as Bishop of Viborg (1478–1498)
Peter Glob (1911–1985), Danish archaeologist
Glob Herman (Robert Herman), a fictional mutant character in American comic books published by Marvel Comics

Other
 glob (programming), a mini-language used for pattern matching of file and folder paths
 Glob (TV series), an Italian comedy series
 The Glob, a 1983 arcade game
 Glob (comics), multiple fictional characters in the Marvel Comics universe
 Luna-Glob, a Moon-exploration program by the Russian Federal Space Agency (Roscosmos)
 The Boston Globe, a Boston newspaper
 Glob (visual system), millimeter areas in the extended V4 that process color
 Glob, one of the heads of the four-faced deity Grob Gob Glob Grod from Adventure Time